Gucio zaczarowany (lit. "The Enchanted Gucio" but translated to English as "Bobo's Metamorphosis") is a poetry collection by Czesław Miłosz. It was first published in 1965.

Steven Serafin called this one of Miłosz's masterpieces.

References

1965 poetry books
Polish poetry collections
Poetry by Czesław Miłosz